Bayles is a hamlet near Alston in Cumbria, England.

Hamlets in Cumbria
Eden District